The IBM Enterprise Storage Server (ESS) or the Shark is an enterprise storage array from IBM.

History
Originally, in 1998 IBM released the IBM 2105 Versatile Storage Server (VSS). It did not meet commercial success and the successor came in 1999 in the form of the ESS, based on the same Seascape architecture.
The Seascape architecture was an IBM storage architecture that included off-the-shelf components, including RS/6000 processors and the Serial Storage Architecture (SSA).
The ESS was also widely known by its IBM internal codename Shark.

The 2001 lineup have a redesigned case; this version won IF design award.

It has been superseded by the IBM DS8000 series of storage servers.

Models
2105-E10 IBM Enterprise Storage Server Model E10 - (1999) 64 disks
2105-E20 IBM Enterprise Storage Server Model E20 - (1999) 128 disks
2105-F10 IBM Enterprise Storage Server Model F10 - (2000) 64 disks
2105-F20 IBM Enterprise Storage Server Model F20 - (2000) 128 disks
2105-750 IBM TotalStorage Enterprise Storage Server Model 750 - (2001)
2105-800 IBM TotalStorage Enterprise Storage Server Model 800 - (2001)

Enclosures 
  ESS expansion enclosure (The E10 model does not support an expansion enclosure) - 256 disks.

External links
 Gustavo Castets et al., IBM Enterprise Storage Server, IBM “Redbook” SG24-5465-01, second edition, 2001 September

See also
IBM Storage

Extended Remote Copy
FlashCopy
Global Mirror
Metro Mirror
IBM Subsystem Device Driver
IBM TotalStorage Expert

References

Enterprise Storage Server